Phoeniculus is a genus of bird in the family Phoeniculidae.  They are restricted to sub-Saharan Africa.

The genus contains the following species:

Members of this genus have long, slightly down-curved, pointed bills with stout bases.  Most spend the day in flocks of 5 to 12 birds, acrobatically climbing in trees or hanging underneath branches, sticking their bills into crevices in search of insects and other small arthropods.  They may brace themselves with their long tails as woodpeckers do, but the tail feathers are not stiff like woodpeckers' and wear easily.  Though their feet are strong, their floppy and bounding flight is weak and not sustained long.  They are noisy and may take breaks from foraging to engage in a "rally": they "cackle" or "chuckle" together and rock back and forth, the wings half opened, the tail oscillating up and down.  This ceremony helps keep the group together.

The groups consist largely of parents, helpers, and young.  Helpers are birds that, instead of breeding, help another pair defend the nest and feed the young.  This practice improves reproductive success.  The helpers may breed the following year; as a result of the bonds they formed with the young they helped, the latter may become their helpers in turn.

References

 
Phoeniculidae
Taxa named by Feliks Paweł Jarocki
Taxonomy articles created by Polbot